Sveitarfélagið Árborg is the biggest municipality in southern Iceland founded in 1998. The biggest town in the municipality is Selfoss. Eyrarbakki and Stokkseyri are two communities on the southern coast and Sandvíkurhreppur is a rural administrative region  between those three other towns.

The area was represented in the fifth episode of the first season of the parody TV series Documentary Now! as the host of an Al Capone Festival.

Twin towns — sister cities

Árborg is twinned with:
 Arendal, Norway
 Kalmar, Sweden
 Savonlinna, Finland

See also
Municipalities of Iceland

References

Municipalities of Iceland
Selfoss